Events in 1937 in animation.



Events

January
 January 9: The first solo Donald Duck cartoon, Don Donald premieres, directed by Ben Sharpsteen and produced by Walt Disney Productions  which launches the Donald Duck series.
 January 24: Georg Woelz' Die Schlacht um Miggershausen premieres.

February
 February 6: David Hand's Mickey Mouse cartoon Magician Mickey premieres, produced by Walt Disney Animation Studios.
 February 20: Ben Sharpsteen's Mickey Mouse, Donald Duck and Goofy cartoon Moose Hunters premieres, produced by Walt Disney Animation Studios.
February 27: Tex Avery's Picador Porky premieres, produced by Warner Bros. Cartoons. This cartoon marks Mel Blanc's first voice acting role in a cartoon.

March
 March 4: 9th Academy Awards: The Country Cousin, produced by The Walt Disney Company, wins the Academy Award for Best Animated Short.
 March 12: The Metro-Goldwyn-Mayer cartoon studio is established.
 March 26; In Crystal City, Texas, spinach growers erect a statue of Popeye.

April
 April 3: Frank Tashlin's Porky Pig cartoon Porky's Romance premieres, produced by Warner Bros. Cartoons, where Petunia Pig makes her debut.
 April 17: The animated short Porky's Duck Hunt, produced by Warner Bros. Cartoons and directed by Tex Avery, is first released. It marks the debut of Daffy Duck.
 April 27: The Mickey Mouse cartoon Mickey's Amateurs, directed by Pinto Colvig, Erdmann Penner and Walt Pfeiffer, premieres.

May
 May 7: Workers at Fleischer Studios go on strike over pay and working conditions. Strike ends several months later on October 12.
 May 15: David Hand's Little Hiawatha premieres, produced by the Walt Disney Animation Studios. It marks the debut of Hiawatha who will later become a popular comics character.
 May 22: Friz Freleng's Clean Pastures premieres, produced by Warner Bros. Cartoons .
 May 29: Jack King's Donald Duck cartoon Modern Inventions premieres, produced by the Walt Disney Animation Studios.

June
 June 5: Tex Avery's Uncle Tom's Bungalow premieres, produced by Warner Bros. Cartoons.

October
 October 15: Ben Sharpsteen's Clock Cleaners, produced by Walt Disney Animation Studios, starring Mickey Mouse, Donald Duck and Goofy, is first released.

November
 November 5: Wilfred Jackson's The Old Mill premieres, produced by the Walt Disney Animation Studios. It marks the first use of the multiplane camera.
 November 26: The Popeye cartoon Popeye the Sailor Meets Ali Baba's Forty Thieves premieres, produced by Fleischer Studios.

December
 December 2: Ferdinand Diehl, Paul Diehl and Hermann Diehl's The Seven Ravens premieres, which is notable for being an animated feature film, several weeks before Disney's own animated feature film Snow White premieres. However, The Seven Ravens is done in stop-motion, while Snow White features pencil animation. 
 December 21: Walt Disney's first animated feature, Snow White and the Seven Dwarfs premieres, co-directed by David Hand, William Cottrell, Wilfred Jackson, Larry Morey, Perce Pearce and Ben Sharpsteen. It becomes a global box office hit.
 December 24: Burt Gillett's Mickey Mouse, Donald Duck and Goofy film Lonesome Ghosts premieres, produced by Walt Disney Animation Studios.

Films released

 April 10 - The Tale of the Fox (France)
 May 19 - Academy Award Review of Walt Disney Cartoons (United States)
 December 2 - The Seven Ravens (Germany)
 December 21 - Snow White and the Seven Dwarfs (United States)

Births

January
 January 1:
 Bernard Longpré, Canadian animator and animation director (Monsieur Pointu), (d. 2002).
 Myrna Gibbs, American ink & paint artist (The Flintstones, DePatie-Freleng Enterprises, Marvel Productions, Peanuts specials), (d. 2021).
 January 2: Terence Rigby, English actor (voice of Silver in Watership Down), (d. 2008).
 January 6: Jaime Diaz, Argentine-born American animator (Warner Bros. Cartoons, Hanna-Barbera, Ruby-Spears Enterprises), sheet timer (Klasky-Csupo, Jumanji, Dora the Explorer, Danger Rangers, American Dad!, Curious George) and director (Duckman, The Fairly OddParents, ChalkZone), (d. 2009).
 January 7: Myrna Bushman, American animation checker (Ruby-Spears Enterprises, DIC Entertainment), storyboard artist (DIC Entertainment, Jetlag Productions, Daisy-Head Mayzie, Doug, PB&J Otter, Stanley), sheet timer (Spiral Zone, Tiny Toon Adventures, Stunt Dawgs, All-New Dennis the Menace, Jumbo Pictures), production assistant (Marvel Productions), production coordinator (Disney Television Animation) and director (Muppet Babies, Bill & Ted's Excellent Adventures, Doug), (d. 2022).
 January 11: Felix Silla, American actor (additional voices in The Lord of the Rings), (d. 2021).
 January 31: Suzanne Pleshette, American actress (voice of Zira in The Lion King II: Simba's Pride, Yubaba and Zeniba in the English dub of Spirited Away), (d. 2008).

February
 February 1: Garrett Morris, American actor and comedian (portrayed himself in the Family Guy episode "Barely Legal", voice of Jack in Easter Fever, Chief Williams in Pound Puppies, Buzzard in the Happily Ever After: Fairy Tales for Every Child episode "Pinocchio", Al McGee in the Justice League episode "In Blackest Night", Albert in the Fairfax episode "Fairfolks").
 February 8: Joe Raposo, American composer, songwriter, pianist, singer and lyricist (Sesame Street, Raggedy Ann & Andy: A Musical Adventure, Dr. Seuss, Madeline), (d. 1989).
 February 15: Ron Dias, American animator and painter (worked for Don Bluth and Walt Disney Company), (d. 2013).
 February 17: Benjamin Whitrow, English actor (voice of Fowler in Chicken Run), (d. 2017).

March
 March 3: Bobby Driscoll, American actor (voice of the title character in Peter Pan), (d. 1968).
 March 10: Robert Abel, American visual effects artist (Tron), (d. 2001).
 March 12: Carlo Bonomi, Italian voice actor and clown (voice of the title character of La Linea, Paperazzi in Calimero, Red and Blue in The Red and the Blue, the title characters and other various characters in Stripy and Pingu), (d. 2022).

April
 April 6: Billy Dee Williams, American actor (voice of Lando Calrissian in the Star Wars franchise, Two-Face in The Lego Batman Movie, Admiral Bitchface in Titan Maximum, himself in The Boondocks episode "The Story of Lando Freeman", The Life & Times of Tim episode " A Tale of Two Rodneys/Keith to the Rescue", and Scooby-Doo and Guess Who? episode "Scooby-Doo and the Sky Town Cool School!").
 April 20: George Takei, American actor, author and activist (voice of Hikaru Sulu in Star Trek: The Animated Series, First Ancestor in Mulan and Mulan II, Kyo Heyerdahl in Hey Arnold!, Master Sensui in Kim Possible, Galactus in The Super Hero Squad Show, Mr. Fixx in the Batman Beyond episode "Rebirth", General Lok Durd in the Star Wars: The Clone Wars episode "Defenders of Peace", Mr. Littlepot in the Amphibia episode "The Shut-In!", Wong in the Spider-Man episode "Doctor Strange", High Mystic in the Jackie Chan Adventures episode "The Chosen One", himself in the Futurama episodes "Where No Fan Has Gone Before", "Proposition Infinity", "Zapp Dingbat", and "Saturday Morning Fun Pit", the Glenn Martin, DDS episode "GlennHog Day", The Simpsons episode "The Burns Cage", the American Dad! episode "N.S.A. (No Snoops Allowed)", and the Scooby-Doo and Guess Who? episode "Hollywood Knights!").
 April 24: Otmar Gutmann, German TV producer, animator and director (creator of Pingu), (d. 1993).

May
 May 1: Nelda Ridley, American animation checker (Bakshi Animation, Hanna-Barbera, Cartoon Network Studios), (d. 2003).
 May 2: Lorenzo Music, American actor (voice of Garfield in Garfield and Friends, Tummi Gummi in Adventures of the Gummi Bears, Peter Venkman in The Real Ghostbusters) (d. 2001).
 May 8: Thomas Pynchon, American novelist (voiced himself in The Simpsons episodes "Diatribe of a Mad Housewife" and "All's Fair in Oven War").
 May 12: George Carlin, American comedian, actor, author and social critic (voice of Rufus in Bill & Ted's Excellent Adventures, the Narrator in Thomas & Friends, Zugor in Tarzan II, Fillmore in Cars, Wizard in Happily N'Ever After, Munchie in The Simpsons episode "D'oh-in' in the Wind"), (d. 2008).
 May 24: Bill Exter, American animator (Warner Bros. Animation, Ruby-Spears, Bebe's Kids, The Pagemaster, Cats Don't Dance), production manager (Warner Bros. Animation), animation checker (Nickelodeon Animation Studio, Toonsylvania, Mad Jack the Pirate) and director (Marvel Productions).
 May 26: Monkey Punch, Japanese manga artist (creator of Lupin III), (d. 2019).

June
 June 1: Morgan Freeman, American actor, director and narrator (voice of Vitruvius in The Lego Movie, himself in the Scooby-Doo and Guess Who? episode "The Last Inmate!").
 June 2: Sally Kellerman, American actress, singer and author (voice of The Seal in The Mouse and His Child, Sunburn in Happily Ever After, the Narrator in Delgo, Principal Stark in Unsupervised, Marshmallow Queen and Romaine Empress in The High Fructose Adventures of Annoying Orange, Dolores Barren in High School USA!), (d. 2022).
 June 3: Edward Winter, American actor (voice of Dr. Buzz Kutt and Owner in Aaahh!!! Real Monsters, President, Sarge and Guard in The Real Adventures of Jonny Quest, Scientist #1 and other various characters in The Angry Beavers), (d. 2001).
 June 11: Johnny Brown, American actor and singer (voice of Splashdown in Rickety Rocket), (d. 2022).
 June 15: Waylon Jennings, American singer, songwriter and musician (voice of Judge Thatcher in Tom Sawyer, the Balladeer in The Angry Beavers episode "The Legend of Kid Friendly", himself in the Family Guy episodes "Chitty Chitty Death Bang" and "To Love and Die in Dixie"), (d. 2002).
 June 20: Antanas Janauskas, Lithuanian film director, designer and writer, (d. 2016).
 June 28: Tom Magliozzi, American radio host (voice of Click Tappet in the Arthur episode "Pick a Car, Any Car", and Click and Clack's As the Wrench Turns, Rusty Rust-eze in Cars and Cars 3) and television writer (Click and Clack's As the Wrench Turns), (d. 2014).

July
 July 2:
 Jim Duffy, American animator (Hanna-Barbera, Klasky-Csupo), (d. 2012).
 Richard Petty, American racing driver (voice of Strip Weathers in Cars and Cars 3).
 July 6: 
Ned Beatty, American actor (voice of Lotso in Toy Story 3, Tortoise John in Rango), (d. 2021).
 Ro Marcenaro, Italian animator and comics artist, (d. 2020).
 July 12: Bill Cosby, American comedian and actor (creator of Fat Albert and the Cosby Kids, Little Bill, and Fatherhood, and voice of the title character in the former).
 July 13: Hurey, Belgian animator (Belvision) and comics artist, (d. 2001).
 July 25: Paul Collins, British actor (voice of John Darling in Peter Pan).
 July 31: Sab Shimono, American actor (voice of Uncle in Jackie Chan Adventures, Takagawa in Scooby-Doo! and the Samurai Sword, the Emperor in Samurai Jack, Gyatso in Avatar: The Last Airbender, Mr. Murakami in Teenage Mutant Ninja Turtles, Grandpa Park in Stretch Armstrong and the Flex Fighters, K3NT in the Legion of Super Heroes episode "The Man from the Edge of Tomorrow").

August
 August 8: Dustin Hoffman, American actor and filmmaker (voice of Master Shifu in the Kung Fu Panda franchise, Milquetoast the Cross-Dressing Cockroach in A Wish for Wings That Work, Benedict Arnold in Liberty's Kids, Roscuro in The Tale of Despereaux, Mr. Bergstrom in The Simpsons episode "Lisa's Substitute").
 August 21: Masako Sugaya, Japanese actress (Aim for the Ace!, Nobody's Boy Remi, Perman, Urusei Yatsura), (d. 2021).

September
 September 2: Len Carlson, Canadian actor (voice of Green Goblin in Spider-Man, Professor Coldheart in Care Bears, Bert Raccoon in The Raccoons, Buzz in Cyberchase, Minimus P.U. in Atomic Betty, Principal Mulligan in Flying Rhino Junior High, Robert Kelly in X-Men, Ganon in The Legend of Zelda and Captain N: The Game Master, Loki in The Marvel Super Heroes), (d. 2006).
 September 6:
 Jo Anne Worley, American actress and comedian (voice of Armoire the Wardrobe in Beauty and the Beast, Hopopotamus in The Wuzzles, Nose in Pound Puppies, Sgt. Bertha Blast in The All-New Popeye Hour, Queen Morphia in Nutcracker Fantasy, Bouffant Beagle in the DuckTales episode "The Good Muddahs", Mrs. Rockweller in the Kim Possible episode "Downhill").
 Sergio Aragonés, Spanish-born Mexican cartoonist and writer (voice of Paco in The Casagrandes episode "Mexican Makeover", himself in the Futurama episode "Lrrreconcilable Ndndifferences").
 Joe Denton, American background artist (Ghostbusters, She-Ra: Princess of Power, Warner Bros. Animation) and storyboard artist (Camp Candy, Warner Bros. Animation, Jumanji, Sabrina: The Animated Series, Family Guy), (d. 2003).
 September 10: Brian Murray, South African actor and theater director (voice of Long John Silver in Treasure Planet), (d. 2018).
 September 13:
 Don Bluth, American animator (Walt Disney Animation Studios) and film director (Banjo the Woodpile Cat,The Secret of NIMH, An American Tail, The Land Before Time, All Dogs Go to Heaven, Rock-a-Doodle, Thumbelina, A Troll in Central Park, The Pebble and the Penguin, Anastasia, Bartok the Magnificent, Titan A.E., founder of Sullivan Bluth Studios).
 Fred Silverman, American television executive and producer (Scooby-Doo, Where Are You!, Mighty Orbots, Piggsburg Pigs!, creator of Meatballs & Spaghetti), (d. 2020).
 September 15: Anatoly Petrov, Russian film director and animator (Happy Merry-Go-Round, Polygon), (d. 2010).
 September 21: Ron Cobb, American cartoonist, animator, director and screenwriter (Walt Disney Animation Studios), (d. 2020).
 September 28: Rod Roddy, American radio and television announcer (voice of Mike the Microphone in House of Mouse, Johnny in the Garfield and Friends episode "Over the Rainbow"), (d. 2003).

October
 October 15: Linda Lavin, American actress and singer (voice of Mama Bird in the Courage the Cowardly Dog episode "Watch the Birdies", Helen in the Bob's Burgers episode "It Snakes a Village").
 October 20: Jonas Rodrigues de Mello, Brazilian actor (voice of Shadowseat in Cassiopeia, Montanha in The Happy Cricket and the Giant Bugs, Brazilian dub voice of various villains in Dragon Ball Z and Rataxes in The Adventures of Babar), (d. 2020).

November
 November 6: Eugene Pitt, American musician (composed the theme music of Nickelodeon), (d. 2018).
 November 12: Mills Lane, American boxing referee (host of Celebrity Deathmatch), (d. 2022).

December
 December 1:
 Bruce Brown, American film director (voice of the Narrator in the SpongeBob SquarePants episode "SpongeBob SquarePants vs. The Big One"), (d. 2017).
 Gennady Sokolsky, Russian children's book illustrator, animator and film director (Happy Merry-Go-Round, Well, Just You Wait!, The Adventures of Lolo the Penguin), (d. 2014).
 December 14: Jerry Eisenberg, American television producer, animator, storyboard artist, and character designer (Hanna-Barbera, Ruby-Spears).
 December 21: Jane Fonda, American actress, activist, and former fashion model (voice of Shuriki in Elena of Avalor, The Dragon in Luck, Maxine Lombard in The Simpsons episode "Opposites A-Frack").

Deaths

July
 July 20: Elmer Wait, American animator (Warner Bros. Cartoons, namesake of Elmer Fudd), dies at age 23.

See also
List of anime by release date (pre-1939)

Sources

External links 
Animated works of the year, listed in the IMDb